James Kraft (born May 6, 1941) is a former member of the Arizona House of Representatives. He served in the House from January 2001 through January 2003, serving district 18. After redistricting in 2002, he ran for re-election in District 10, but lost in the Republican primary to Linda Gray and Doug Quelland.

References

Republican Party members of the Arizona House of Representatives
1941 births
Living people